Muhammad Shafi Siddiqui (born 12 August 1965) has been Justice of the Sindh High Court since 20 March 2012.

References

1965 births
Living people
Judges of the Sindh High Court
Pakistani judges